Anthony Crawford may refer to:

Anthony Crawford (bass musician), American musician, producer and songwriter
Anthony Crawford (musician), American musician
Anthony Crawford (lynching victim), African American man who was killed by a lynch mob in South Carolina in 1916
Shep Crawford (Anthony Schappel Crawford, born 1970), American R&B and gospel musician, songwriter, and record producer